Derrick Marks (born September 14, 1993) is an American basketball player for Tramec Cento of the Italian Serie A2 Basket. He played college basketball for the Boise State Broncos.

College career
Marks was part of two Bronco teams to reach the NCAA Tournament in his 4 years at Boise State. As a senior in 2014–15, Marks averaged 21.3 points per game, leading the Mountain West Conference. Marks was named the Mountain West Player of the Year that year.

Professional career
In the summer of 2015 it was announced that Marks would join the Philadelphia 76ers summer league team. However, he never did play in the summer league and eventually signed with Orsi Derthona Basket in Italy. During his rookie season, he averaged 13.7 points, 3.6 rebounds and 1.5 assists per game. For the following season, he signed with  Basket Ravenna.

In 2018, Marks signed with Manisa B.B. in Turkey. He posted the best statistics of his professional career, averaging 18.9 points, 4.2 assists, and 4.0 rebounds per game white completing his Boise State coursework.

Marks signed with Basket Torino of the Italian Serie A2 Basket in 2019. He averaged 15.2 points per game and was shooting 50.0% from the field before the season was ended due to the COVID-19 pandemic.

On July 29, 2020, Marks signed a one-year deal with Pistoia Basket 2000. On August 31, 2021, he signed with BC Balkan Botevgrad of the Bulgarian National Basketball League.

References

External links
Boise State Broncos bio

1993 births
Living people
American expatriate basketball people in Bulgaria
American expatriate basketball people in Germany
American expatriate basketball people in Italy
American expatriate basketball people in Turkey
American men's basketball players
Basket Torino players
Basketball players from Chicago
BC Balkan Botevgrad players
Boise State Broncos men's basketball players
Crailsheim Merlins players
Erie BayHawks (2017–2019) players
Shooting guards
Pistoia Basket 2000 players